Heiwa Park (平和公園) is a public park is located in Chikusa-ku, Nagoya in central Japan.

The spacious park on the eastern side of the city has an area of around 150 hectares. It is dedicated to peace. The park is popular amongst visitors especially during the Hanami season in spring. The park features a statue of Kannon, the boddhisatva of mercy, trails through the woodlands, ponds and a large cemetery, Also in there still exist Tomb of Matsudaira Senchiyo, 8th son of Tokugawa Ieyasu, the first shōgun of Tokugawa Shogunate.

Access by public transport is by Jiyūgaoka Station with Meijō Line or Higashiyama Koen Station on the Higashiyama Line.

External links 
 Park map on Nagoya City website
 

Chikusa-ku, Nagoya
Cemeteries in Japan
Parks and gardens in Nagoya